Peerakiat Siriluethaiwattana (born 16 August 1989) is a former Thai tennis player. He was born in Kampaengpetch, Thailand. He lives in Bangkok, Thailand.
Siriluethaiwattana had a career high ATP singles ranking of 704 achieved on 7 June 2010. He also had a career high ATP doubles ranking of 567 achieved on 13 August 2012.

Siriluethaiwattana represented Thailand in the Davis Cup.

References

External links

1989 births
Living people
Peerakiat Siriluethaiwattana
Peerakiat Siriluethaiwattana